Sound level refers to various logarithmic measurements of audible vibrations and may refer to:

Sound exposure level, measure of the sound exposure of a sound relative to a reference value
Sound power level, measure of the rate at which sound energy is emitted, reflected, transmitted or received, per unit time
Sound pressure level, measure of the effective pressure of a sound relative to a reference value
Sound intensity level, measure of the intensity of a sound relative to a reference value
Sound velocity level, measure of the effective particle velocity of a sound relative to a reference value

See also
 Level (logarithmic quantity)
 Loudness
 Volume (disambiguation)
 Line level